Heliophila coronopifolia is a species of flowering plant in the genus Heliophila. It is endemic to Namibia and found in the Northern Cape and Western Cape.

Distribution 
Heliophila coronopifolia is found from Namaqualand to the Western Cape.

Conservation status 
Heliophila coronopifolia is classified as Least Concern.

References

External links 
 
 

Flora of Namibia
Flora of South Africa
Flora of the Cape Provinces
Brassicaceae